Pavel Zoubok Gallery is an art gallery in New York City. Founded in 1997 by Pavel Zoubok, the gallery's program focuses on collage, assemblage, and mixed media installation.

References

External links
 

Art museums and galleries in Manhattan
Chelsea, Manhattan
Zoubok, Pavel
Contemporary art galleries in the United States
Art galleries established in 1997
1997 establishments in New York City